The Men's 200 metre individual medley SM8 swimming event at the 2004 Summer Paralympics was competed on 23 September. It was won by Wang Xiao Fu, representing .

Final round

23 Sept. 2004, evening session

References

M